The West Bengal Board of Secondary Education is the West Bengal state government administered autonomous examining authority for the Standard 10 examination (or secondary school level examination) of West Bengal, India. It has come into force by the West Bengal Board of Secondary Education Act-1963.

See also
 West Bengal Board of Madrasah Education
 West Bengal Board of Primary Education
 West Bengal Council of Higher Secondary Education
 School Education Department, West Bengal

References

External links
  

Education in West Bengal
State secondary education boards of India
1951 establishments in West Bengal
Government agencies established in 1951
State agencies of West Bengal
Educational boards based in Kolkata